Jennifer Saberon (born 20 January 1969) is a Filipino former professional tennis player.

A serve-and-volleyer, Saberon started playing tennis at the age of 12 and was ranked amongst the world's top 20 in junior tennis. She made a Wimbledon semi-final in girls' doubles in 1986.

Saberon competed for the Philippines Federation Cup team in the late 1980s, appearing in nine ties.

As a national representative she also featured in multiple editions of the Southeast Asian Games and won eight medals, including a mixed doubles gold at her home games in Manila in 1991.

Saberon left the tour in the 1990s to study in the United States and play collegiate tennis, first at St. Ambrose University in Iowa and then Loyola Marymount University.

References

External links
 
 
 

1969 births
Living people
Filipino female tennis players
Loyola Marymount Lions athletes
Southeast Asian Games medalists in tennis
Southeast Asian Games gold medalists for the Philippines
Southeast Asian Games silver medalists for the Philippines
Southeast Asian Games bronze medalists for the Philippines
Competitors at the 1985 Southeast Asian Games
Competitors at the 1987 Southeast Asian Games
Competitors at the 1991 Southeast Asian Games
College women's tennis players in the United States